0H (zero H) or 0-H may refer to:

0h, a notation for zero hours
0h, the part of the spring equinox meridiator that has the celestial longitude 0° (±0°); see Right ascension

See also
OH (disambiguation)
H0 (disambiguation)